Victor Kibet (born 26 June 1980) is a Kenyan sprinter. He competed in the men's 400 metres at the 2004 Summer Olympics.

References

1980 births
Living people
Athletes (track and field) at the 2004 Summer Olympics
Kenyan male sprinters
Olympic athletes of Kenya
Place of birth missing (living people)